Moderate is an ideological category which designates a rejection of radical or extreme views, especially in regard to politics and religion. A moderate is considered someone occupying any mainstream position avoiding extreme views. In American politics, a moderate is considered someone occupying a centre position on the left–right political spectrum.

Political position

Japan 
Japan's right-wing Liberal Democratic Party (LDP) has traditionally been divided into two main factions: the based on bureaucratic "conservative mainstream" (保守本流) and the hawkish nationalist "conservative anti-mainstream" (保守傍流). Among them, "conservative mainstream" is also considered a moderate wing within the LDP. The LDP's faction Kōchikai, is considered a moderate wing. The current LDP has conflicts between moderate patriotist and extreme nationalist supporters.

Democratic Socialist Party (DSP) is formed by a group of politicians who splintered off of the Japan Socialist Party (JSP) in 1960. The party advocated a moderate social-democratic politics and supported the U.S.-Japan Alliance. The party supported neoliberalism from the 1980s, and was disbanded in 1994.

Moderates social-democrats of the JSP formed the Democratic Party of Japan (DPJ) with conservative-liberal Sakigake and other moderates of the LDP. Most of the DPJ's mainstream factions moved to the Constitutional Democratic Party of Japan (CDP), but the former DPJ's right-wing moved to the Democratic Party for the People after 2019.

United States 
In recent years, the term political moderates has gained traction as a buzzword. The existence of the ideal moderate is disputed because of a lack of a moderate political ideology. Voters who describe themselves as centrist often mean that they are moderate in their political views, advocating neither extreme left-wing nor right-wing politics.

Gallup polling indicated that American voters identified as moderate between 35–38% of the time during the 1990s and 2000s. Voters may identify with moderation for a number of reasons: pragmatic, ideological, or otherwise. It has also been suggested that individuals vote for centrist parties for purely statistical reasons.

See also 

 Centrism
 Centre-left politics
 Centre-right politics
 Independent voter
 Moderate Democrats
 Moderate conservatism
 Moderate nationalism
 Moderate Party (disambiguation)
 Moderate Republicans (modern United States)
 Radical centrism
 The Establishment

References 
Notes

Bibliography

External links

Centrism
Political terminology